Rouzer is an unincorporated community in Clay County, West Virginia, United States. It was also known as Shelley Junction.

References 

Unincorporated communities in West Virginia
Unincorporated communities in Clay County, West Virginia
Charleston, West Virginia metropolitan area